Wet-bulb conditions are the point at which humidity and heat reach a point the evaporation of sweat no longer cools the human body, leading to the death of otherwise healthy persons. Scientists at Lamont–Doherty Earth Observatory, surveying data from weather stations between 1979 and 2017, found 7,000 instances of these conditions, mostly in South Asia, the coastal Middle East, and southwest North America.

Wet-bulb conditions occur when relative humidity is above 95% and temperatures are at least 31.1° Celsius (88° Fahrenheit), or, a wet-bulb temperature of 35° Celsius (95° Fahrenheit).

References

Effects of climate change
Global health